Sztandar Mlodych (Standard for the Young) Published between 1950 and 1997 in Warsaw. Was a Polish, pro-Soviet  propaganda newspaper targeting the youth.

References 

Newspapers published in Warsaw